Jaroslav Týfa was a Czech wrestler. He competed in the men's Greco-Roman middleweight at the 1908 Summer Olympics, representing Bohemia.

References

External links
 

Year of birth missing
Year of death missing
Czech male sport wrestlers
Olympic wrestlers of Bohemia
Wrestlers at the 1908 Summer Olympics
Place of birth missing